Sandra Semchuk (born 1948) is a Canadian photographic artist.

In 1998, Presentation House, Vancouver, B.C. programmed "How Far Back is Home ..."  a 25-year retrospective of Semchuk's career highlighting her relationship to identity, morality and land.

Sandra was awarded a grant from 2008-2015 from the Canada First World War Internment Fund to complete her book on Ukrainians in Canada, The Stories Were Not Told: Stories and Photographs from Canada's First Internment Camps, 1914-1920.

Career 
Semchuk's early photographic works have been said to belong to a “broad general category of documentary”. Her photographic portrait works from this era, more specifically her 1982 series of eighty-seven photographs entitled Excerpts from a Diary, address themes of death and family  whilst presenting a narrative of “self-examination and transformation” through her use of self-portraits and images containing domestic and prairie backgrounds.

Penny Cousineau-Levine, the author of Faking Death: Canadian Art Photography and the Canadian Imagination, writes of Excerpts from a Diary that the journey of Semchuk's protagonist “follows the structure of classic initiatory voyages of descent and return, death and rebirth, the prototype of which is the Greek legend … of Orpheus, who, grief-stricken at the death of his wife, descends to the underworld to convince the god Pluto to allow her to return to earth.”  Cousineau-Levine goes on to state that these photographic sequences “take the shape of heroic descent into darkness and peril, into an experience of death and nothingness followed by rebirth, a transformed relation to the self, and a renewed connection to life”, something that she claims offers “an understanding of death that is particularly relevant to Canadian photography.”

Collaboration with James Nicholas 
James Nicholas & Sandra Semchuk were married until James died suddenly and unexpectedly in 2007. James was a Cree artist from Nelson House, Manitoba. He suffered extensively in residential schools as a child. Their collaborative work focused on the multiplicity of relationships to land, cultural geography, settler and indigenous relationships and memory.

Collaboration with Skeena Reece 
In 2013, Sandra Semchuk worked with performance artist Skeena Reece on a piece titled Touch Me for the exhibition Witnesses: Art and Canada’s Indian Residential Schools. During this performance, Reece and Semchuk struggle with themes of forgiveness and mother-daughter relationships as Reece bathes Semchuk.

Education 
 1983    Master's degree in Photography, University of New Mexico
 1970    Bachelor of Fine Arts, University of Saskatchewan, Saskatchewan
 1970    Professional "A" Teachers Certificate, Province of Saskatchewan

Select solo exhibitions 
 2016 The Stories Were Not Told, Comox Valley Art Gallery,  Courtenay, BC
 1998  How Far Back is Home . . . ., Presentation House, Vancouver, B.C.
 1991  Coming to Death's Door, a daughter/ father collaboration, Presentation House, Vancouver, B.C.  
 1991   Moving Parallel: Reconstructed Performances from Daily Life, Photographers Gallery, Saskatoon, Saskatchewan; Prince George Art Gallery, Prince George, British Columbia; University of Waterloo Art Gallery, Waterloo, Ontario; Robert McLaughlin Gallery, Oshawa, Ontario; Art, Gallery of Windsor, Windsor, Ontario; McKenzie Art Gallery, Regina, Saskatchewan; Nickle Arts Museum, Calgary, Alberta; Floating Gallery, Winnipeg, Manitoba; Gallery 44, Toronto, Ontario
 1990  Paralleling the Bird, Forest City Gallery, London, Ontario; Contemporary Art Gallery, Vancouver, British Columbia
 1986  Ritual, the Photographic Sequence, Forest City Gallery, London, Ontario
 1986   The Coburg Gallery, Vancouver, British Columbia
 1982   Excerpts from a Diary, Mendel Art Gallery, Saskatoon, Saskatchewan
 1979   The Photographers Gallery, London, England
 1975   The Photographers Gallery, Saskatoon, Saskatchewan
 1973   The Photographers Gallery, Saskatoon, Saskatchewan

Awards 
 Governor General's Award in Visual and Media Arts (2018)

Collections 
 Vancouver Art Gallery, Vancouver
Canada Council Art Bank, Ottawa
 Canadian Broadcasting Corporation, Regina
 Canadian Museum of Contemporary Photography, Ottawa
 Dunlop Art Gallery, Regina
 Edmonton Art Gallery, Edmonton
 McKenzie Art Gallery, Edmonton
 Mendel Art Gallery, Saskatoon
 Mount St. Vincent University of Art Gallery, Halifax
 Museum of Modern Art, New York
 Photographers Gallery, Saskatoon
 San Francisco Museum of Modern Art, San Francisco
 University of New Mexico, Albuquerque

Publications 
Semchuk, Sandra. 2018. "The Stories Were Not Told: Canada's First World War Internment Camps." The University of Alberta Press. Print. 
Semchuk, Sandra, and Laurel Tien. "Telling Story! Voice in Photography: An Online Visual Art Critical Studies Program Evaluation." International Review of Research in Open and Distance Learning 5.3 (2004): n. pag.ProQuest Education Journals [ProQuest]. Web. 17 Sept. 2016.
Semchuk, Sandra. Toward Real Change: My Photographic Work Done in Saskatchewan from 1972-1982 and in New Mexico from 1982-1983. Diss. U of New Mexico, 1983. Albuquerque, New Mexico: U of New Mexico, 1983. Simon Fraser University Library Catalogue. Web. 17 Sept. 2016.
Semchuk, Sandra. 1991. Coming to Death's Door: A Daughter/Father Collaboration. North Vancouver: Presentation House Gallery, 1992. Print. 
Semchuk, Sandra. 1989. Moving Parallel: Reconstructed Performances from Daily Life. Toronto: Gallery 44 Centre for Contemporary Photography, 1989. Print.

References

1948 births
Artists from Saskatchewan
Canadian photographers
Living people
People from Meadow Lake, Saskatchewan
Governor General's Award in Visual and Media Arts winners